Millerovo is a town and the administrative center of Millerovsky District in Rostov Oblast, Russia, close to the  border with Ukraine.

Population

History

It was founded in 1786 and named after its founder, the army officer Ivan Abramovich Müller, who set up a farm estate after he received vacant land by the river deep in the Decree of the Empress Catherine the Great on February 14, 1786. At the end of the 19th century, it became an important railway hub. Facilities were built to process a large part of agricultural products coming from the areas of the upper Don and Ukraine to send to the central provinces of Russia. It was granted town status in 1926.

During World War II, in July 1942, an encirclement of Soviet troops by Wehrmacht forces occurred around the town (Battle of Kalach), resulting in over 50.000 Soviet soldiers being captured. 

On 25 February 2022, during the Russian invasion of Ukraine, the Millerovo air base was reportedly hit by a Ukrainian Tochka-U missile. Neither the Ukrainian nor Russian authorities commented on the report.

Administrative and municipal status
Within the framework of administrative divisions, Millerovo serves as the administrative center of Millerovsky District. As an administrative division, it is incorporated within Millerovsky District as Millerovskoye Urban Settlement. As a municipal division, this administrative unit also has urban settlement status and is a part of Millerovsky Municipal District.

Economy
The basis of the town's economy is food grain.

Military
At the airfield was stationed the headquarters of the 16th Guards Fighter Aviation Division after its withdrawal from Germany in 1993 until 1998. Also until 2009, the 19th Nikopol Guards Fighter Aviation Regiment (19 Gv IAP)—a part of the 51st Air Defense Corps of the 4th Army of Air Force and Air Defense—was stationed there. The regiment was reorganized in 2009 as the 6969th Air Base, a part of the 7th Brigade of Military-Space Defense. MiG-29 fighters of both the former 19th GvIAP and the 31st Fighter Air Regiment, previously disbanded in Zernograd, are located at the airfield.

People born in Millerovo
Mira Żelechower-Aleksiun, Polish painter
Denis Glushakov, footballer

References

Notes

Sources

Cities and towns in Rostov Oblast
Millerovsky District
Populated places established in 1786
1786 establishments in the Russian Empire
Don Host Oblast